Nadong Bhutia (born 25 November 1993) is an Indian former footballer who played as a striker or winger.

Career

United Sikkim
Bhutia made his debut for United Sikkim F.C. on 19 January 2013 during an I-League match against Dempo S.C. at the Duler Stadium in Mapusa, Goa in which he was in Starting 11 and then went on as a 58th-minute substitute for Lineker Machado; United Sikkim lost the match 7–0.

Eagles
On 5 December 2013 it was announced that Nadong has signed up with Eagles F.C. of Kerala on loan for 2013-14 season along with Bijendra Rai, Avinabo Bag, Jagroop Singh, Bisheshwor Singh, Biswajit Saha, Ramandeep Singh and Govin Singh. Moreover, IMG-Reliance, the organisers of the proposed IPL-style football tournament Indian Super League, and Eagles F.C. will facilitate a two to six week training stint for the eight players with UK based Reading F.C. Academy.

Mumbai City FC
Nadong represented Mumbai City FC in the 2014 Indian Super League and made 11 appearances and assisted with his outstanding performance he was once adjourned as the "SWIFT MOMENT OF THE MATCH AWARD". Nicolas Anelka his teammate too once said this is a big player to watch in future "once".

Atlético de Kolkata
In July 2015 Bhutia was drafted to play for Atlético de Kolkata in the 2015 Indian Super League. Habas pronounced him as a speedster of ATK.

Minerva Punjab FC
In November 2017 Bhutia joined Minerva Punjab FC.

Career statistics

Club
Statistics accurate as of 22 March 2016

Honours
Real Kashmir
I-League 2nd Division (1): 2017-18

References

Indian footballers
1993 births
Living people
I-League players
United Sikkim F.C. players
Indian Super League players
Mumbai City FC players
ATK (football club) players
People from Kalimpong district
Footballers from West Bengal
Association football forwards
Association football wingers
Real Kashmir FC players
Royal Wahingdoh FC players
Minerva F.C. players